Nationality words link to articles with information on the nation's poetry or literature (for instance, Irish or France).

Events

Works published
 Sir Richard Blackmore — A Satyr Against Wit, published anonymously; an attack on the "Wits", including John Dryden
 Samuel Cobb — Poetae Britannici his most famous poem, a survey of previous English poetry in a light style, clear diction, and imagery that later critics like John Nichols considered "sublime"

 Daniel Defoe — The Pacificator, published anonymously, verse satire in the literary war between the "Men of Sense" and the "Men of Wit"
 John Dryden — Fables, Ancient and Modern, the poet's final anthology
 William King — The Transactioneer With Some of his Philosophical Fancies, published anonymously, a satire on Sir Hans Sloane, editor of the Philosophical Transactions of the Royal Society
 John Pomfret — Reason
 Nahum Tate — Panacea, a poem upon tea
 John Tutchin — The Foreigners, published anonymously; provoked a reply from Daniel Defoe in The True-Born Englishman in 1701
 Edward Ward — The Reformer, published anonymously
 Samuel Wesley — An Epistle to a Friend concerning Poetry
 Thomas Yalden — The Temple of Fame
 Anonymous — Jaħasra Mingħajr Ħtija, Gozo

Births
Death years link to the corresponding "[year] in poetry" article:
 February 2 – Johann Christoph Gottsched (died 1766), German poet
 January 14 – Christian Friedrich Henrici (died 1764), German poet
 May 26 – Nikolaus Ludwig von Zinzendorf (died 1760), German poet
 September 11 – James Thomson (died 1748), Scottish poet
 September 30 – Stanisław Konarski, born Hieronim Konarski (died 1773), Polish pedagogue, educational reformer, political writer, poet, dramatist, Piarist monk and precursor of the Polish Enlightenment
 October 13 – Phanuel Bacon (died 1783) English playwright, poet and author
 Also – David French (died 1742), English Colonial American poet
 Year uncertain – Richard Lewis (died 1734), English Colonial American poet

Deaths
Birth years link to the corresponding "[year] in poetry" article:
 March 14 – Henry Killigrew (born 1613), English clergyman, poet and playwright
 May 12 – John Dryden (born 1631), English poet, former Poet Laureate
 July 19 – Thomas Creech (born 1659), English translator of classical poetry, found dead this day from suicide
 November 16 – Jamie Macpherson (born 1675), Scottish outlaw, famed for his lament, hanged
Also:
 Francisco Antonio de Fuentes y Guzmán (born 1643), Guatemalan historian and poet
 Bahinabai (born 1628), Maharashtran Varkari female poet-saint
 Edward Howard died about this year (born 1624), English playwright and poet, brother of Sir Robert Howard

See also

 Poetry
 List of years in poetry
 17th century in poetry
 17th century in literature
 18th century in poetry
 18th century in literature

Notes

17th-century poetry
Poetry